The Roman Catholic Diocese of Chiclayo  is a Latin Catholic suffragan diocese in the Ecclesiastical province of Piura in Peru's northwestern Lambayeque region.

Its cathedral episcopal see is Catedral Santa María in the city of Chiclayo.

History 
The Diocese of Chiclayo was established on 17 December 1956 as the Diocese of Chiclayo on territory split off from the Diocese of Cajamarca and Metropolitan Archdiocese of Trujillo. On 17 April 1963, some of its territory was lost to form the Territorial Prelature of Chota.

Bishops
 Bishop Daniel Figueroa Villón (17 December 1956 – 30 January 1967), previously Titular Bishop of Parnassus & Auxiliary Bishop of Arequipa (Peru) (12 April 1945 – 22 September 1946), Bishop of Huancayo (Peru) (22 September 1946 – 17 December 1956)
 Auxiliary Bishop Luis Sánchez-Moreno Lira (30 April 1961 – 26 April 1968), Titular Bishop of Nilopolis (30 April 1961 – 10 January 1978), Bishop-Prelate of Yauyos (Peru) (26 April 1968 – 2 March 1996), later Metropolitan Archbishop of Arequipa (2 March 1996 – 29 November 2003)
 Bishop Ignacio María de Orbegozo y Goicoechea (26 April 1968 – 4 May 1998), previously Bishop-Prelate of Yauyos (12 April 1957 – 26 April 1968), Titular Bishop of Ariassus (29 October 1963 – 26 April 1968)
 Bishop Jesús Moliné Labarte (4 May 1998 – 3 November 2014), previously Coadjutor Bishop of Chiclayo (8 February 1997 – 4 May 1998)
 Archbishop-Bishop Robert Francis Prevost, O.S.A. (12 December 2014 – 30 January 2023)
 Apostolic Administrator from 3 November 2014

Coadjutor bishop
Jesús Moliné Labarte (1997-1998)

Auxiliary bishop
Luis Sánchez-Moreno Lira (1961-1968), appointed Prelate of Yauyos

Other priests of this diocese who became bishops
Marco Antonio Cortez Lara, appointed Coadjutor Bishop of Tacna y Moquegua in 2005
Héctor Eduardo Vera Colona, appointed Bishop of Ica in 2007

See also 
 Roman Catholicism in Peru

References

Sources and external links
 GCatholic.org, with incumbent biography links 
 Catholic Hierarchy
 Diocese website 

Roman Catholic dioceses in Peru
Roman Catholic Ecclesiastical Province of Piura
Christian organizations established in 1956
Roman Catholic dioceses and prelatures established in the 20th century
Chiclayo